Denise J. Peterson-Rafuse is a Canadian politician, who represented the electoral district of Chester-St. Margaret's in the Nova Scotia House of Assembly from 2009 to 2017 as a member of the Nova Scotia New Democratic Party.

Early life and education
Peterson-Rafuse earned a Bachelor of Public Relations from Mount Saint Vincent University in 1986. She worked for the Canadian Cancer Society and the Heart and Stroke Foundation.

Political career
In 2009, Peterson-Rafuse successfully ran for the New Democratic Party nomination in the riding of Chester-St. Margaret's. She was elected in the 2009 provincial election and was re-elected in the 2013 provincial election.

On June 19, 2009, Peterson-Rafuse was appointed to the Executive Council of Nova Scotia as Minister of Community Services, Minister responsible for Seniors and the Advisory Council on the Status of Women, and chair of the Senior Citizens' Secretariat.

In March 2016, Peterson-Rafuse was diagnosed with multiple sclerosis. On April 6, 2016, Peterson-Rafuse announced that she would be taking a leave of absence to deal with her diagnosis.

In the 2017 election, Peterson-Rafuse was defeated by Liberal Hugh MacKay.

For the 2021 election, Peterson-Rafuse endorsed the Progressive Conservatives for their proposed health care plan, citing her prior diagnosis of multiple sclerosis and the difficulties in finding adequate support.

Electoral record

|-

|New Democratic Party
|Denise Peterson-Rafuse
|align="right"|3341 
|align="right"|35.25 
|align="right"|
|-
 
|Progressive Conservative
|Janet Elizabeth Irwin
|align="right"|3193 
|align="right"|33.69 
|align="right"|
|-

|Liberal
|Timothy Whitman Harris 
|align="right"|2943 
|align="right"|31.06 
|align="right"|
|}

|-

|New Democratic Party
|Denise Peterson-Rafuse
|align="right"|4835
|align="right"|48.09
|align="right"|
|-
 
|Progressive Conservative
|Judy Streatch
|align="right"|2762
|align="right"|27.47
|align="right"|
|-
 
|Liberal
|Jo-Ann Grant
|align="right"|2122
|align="right"|21.11
|align="right"|
|-

|}

References

External links
 Members of the Nova Scotia Legislative Assembly
 NDP profile

Year of birth missing (living people)
Living people
Women government ministers of Canada
Nova Scotia New Democratic Party MLAs
Members of the Executive Council of Nova Scotia
People with multiple sclerosis
Women MLAs in Nova Scotia
21st-century Canadian politicians
21st-century Canadian women politicians